Lyrocteis is a genus of benthic comb jellies. It is the only genus in the monotypic family Lyroctenidae.

Morphology
The individuals are rather large benthic ctenophores (up to 15 cm) in the shape of a lyre. They have a basal body and two curved outgrowths, from which the fishing filaments emanate, which they use to capture their planktonic food.

Species
The genus comprises the following species:
 Lyrocteis flavopallidus Robilliard and Dayton, 1972
 Lyrocteis imperatoris Komai, 1941

References

Tentaculata
Animal families